Giuseppe Lomellini (Genoa, 1723 - Genoa, 1803) was the 175th Doge of the Republic of Genoa.

Biography 
Lomellini ascended to dogal power on February 4, 1777, the one hundred and thirty in biennial succession and the one hundred and seventy-fifth in republican history. For the coronation ceremony at the Genoa Cathedral, the Genoese senate ordered a new purple and a new royal cloak for the wear of the previous clothing and greeted the election of the new doge with fifty-one cannon shots instead of the thirty thunder routines. During his dogate the ruinous fire of the Ducal palace occurred on the morning of November 3, 1777, followed by a prompt reconstruction and embellishment of the Palace. The following year the construction of the so-called "New Road" was decided. The two-year term ended on February 4, 1779. Giuseppe Lomellini died in Genoa in 1803.

See also 

 Republic of Genoa
 Doge of Genoa

References 

18th-century Doges of Genoa
1723 births
1803 deaths